Djedeida is a town and commune in the Manouba Governorate, Tunisia. It is about 25 km west of Tunis. As of 2021 it had a population of 45,000.

See also
List of cities in Tunisia

References

Populated places in Tunisia
Communes of Tunisia
Tunisia geography articles needing translation from French Wikipedia